USS Cole is the name of two ships of the United States Navy;

See also
 
 USS Cole bombing, a suicide attack against USS Cole (DDG-67) on 12 October 2000.

United States Navy ship names